Suntaži Manor is a manor house in the historical region of Vidzeme, northern Latvia. Originally built as a one-story structure near the end of the 18th century, it was enlarged during the 19th century. Severely damaged by fire in 1905, it was restored in 1909. Though the building housed the Suntaži primary school after 1920, it has housed the Suntaži secondary school since 1952.

See also
List of palaces and manor houses in Latvia

References

External links
  Suntaži Manor
 

Manor houses in Latvia